Kakovikha Bay is a bay in the White Sea near Ostrovnoy, Russia. Located on the Tersky Coast.

References

Bays of Russia
Bays of the White Sea